Historically, the political post of Prime Minister, officially called President of the Council of Ministers, existed in Brazil in two different periods: from 1847 to 1889 (during the Empire) and from 1961 to 1963 (under the Fourth Republic).

The parliamentary system was first introduced in the country in 1847 by Emperor Pedro II and maintained until the abolition of the monarchy in 1889. The system was briefly restored during the tenure of President João Goulart between 1961 and 1963, after a constitutional amendment approved by his opponents before the beginning of his term created the post; it was abolished with a plebiscite.

Below are more detailed descriptions of the post in each period.

Presidents of the Council of Ministers of the Empire of Brazil (1847–1889)

The political position of Prime Minister of Brazil was first created in 1847 by the Brazilian Emperor Pedro II officially as President of the Council of Ministers, but he was referred to by the press and the people as President of the Cabinet. Often, the title President of the Council, a shortened version of the official style, was also employed.

The 1824 Brazilian Constitution did not require the Emperor to appoint a prime minister; nor did it provide for a parliamentary system of government, instead vesting the Executive authority in the Emperor himself, and stipulating that the Emperor was to be aided by ministers that he was free to appoint and dismiss. However, Emperor Pedro II decided to appoint a president of the Council among his ministers, to lead the workings of the Government. He also chose to create a sort of parliamentary government, whereby the prime minister would be someone who could command a majority in the Chamber of Deputies, the lower House of the Brazilian Imperial Parliament, known as General Assembly. Therefore, even without being required by the Constitution, the Emperor started to exercise his authority in a manner compatible with parliamentary government, only appointing as prime minister someone who could retain parliamentary support, etc.

However, the emperor was not a figurehead monarch like other heads of State in a parliamentary system. The prime minister needed to retain the political confidence both of a majority of the Chamber of Deputies and of the Emperor, who actively scrutinized the workings of the Government. Sometimes the Emperor would dissolve the Chamber of Deputies and summon new elections (a power he possessed under the Constitution), or dismiss the prime minister, due to his own political beliefs about the efficiency of the Government. Thus, the Emperor would often dismiss a prime minister, and then appoint someone else from the same party. All this led to a succession of short-lived Cabinets. The emperor retained decision-making powers with regard to the signature or veto of bills passed by Parliament, and would not always abide by the advice of his ministers. And that was seen as normal given that the monarch wasn't required by the Constitution to reign in a parliamentary system, and the establishment of one was only a limited and voluntary decision of Pedro II.

Therefore, the parliamentary system voluntarily established by Emperor Pedro II wasn't identical to the standard of a parliamentary government with a Head of State that reigns but does not govern, given that the Emperor retained part of the control over the daily affairs of his government. Thus, the parliamentary system that was put in place in the reign of Pedro II can be termed a semi-parliamentary Government, and can be compared to the political system of some republics, such as France, that are governed under a semi-presidential system, in which the Head of State has more than just the customary reserve powers, but there is also a prime minister who needs to maintain the confidence of Parliament in order to retain his office.

This co-existence of a Head of State with real powers and influence with a prime minister responsible before Parliament was dubbed by many Brazilian political scientists as parlamentarismo às avessas (backwards parliamentarism), a criticism corresponding to their view that, in the parliamentary system created by Emperor Pedro II, the Chamber of Deputies was the weaker party, and the survival of the Cabinet depended more on the confidence of the Emperor than in that of Parliament.

Shortcomings in party loyalty, with members of Parliament and groups of members rooting for their own interests and not always abiding by the directives of the party leadership also contributed greatly to short-lived Cabinets. Indeed, it was very common for a Prime Minister to be replaced due to lack of support from his party's backbenchers, causing the Prime Minister to be replaced with somebody else from the same party, during the same Parliament.

During the forty-nine years of Pedro II's personal reign, from 1840 until 1889 there were sixteen parliamentary elections (eleven provoked by the dissolution of Parliament by the Emperor at the Prime Minister's request, with the summoning of new elections, and five others provoked by the expiration of the term of office of the members of the Chamber of Deputies). This means that, on average, each legislature of the Chamber of Deputies had a life span slightly superior to three years. However, in the forty two years between the creation of the office of Prime Minister in 1847 and its abolition in 1889, there were thirty two appointments to the presidency of the council, which means that prime ministerships lasted on average a little more than a year and four months. Certain politicians, however, like the Duke of Caxias, Marquis of Olinda, and Zacarias de Góis e Vasconcelos managed to regain the prime ministership after having lost it. Caxias and Zacarias Góis e Vasconcellos each served three times as President of the council, while Olinda held the office of Prime Minister for a record of four times.

The president of the Council owed his position to both his party's majority in the Legislature (and to his party's willingness to support him in the Chamber) and to the Emperor, and these two sources of authority (parliamentary backing and imperial appointment) could sometimes come into conflict. 19th century abolitionist leader and historian Joaquim Nabuco said:

The shortest prime-ministership was the first of the three periods of Zacarias Góis e Vasconcellos in office, when he occupied the presidency of the council for just a few days in May 1862 before being replaced. The longest continuous prime-ministership corresponded to the period when the Viscount of Rio Branco was in office: he served as President of the council from March 1871 until June 1875. The Viscount of Rio Branco served as Prime Minister only once, however, and his period of service as Prime Minister is surpassed by the total duration of the four non-consecutive premierships of the Marquis of Olinda, making Olinda the longest serving President of the Council if non-consecutive time is considered.

The position of prime minister was abolished with the deposition of the Monarchy in 1889.

The proclamation of the Republic as a coup to remove the Council of Ministers and its President

The events of the proclamation of the Republic on 15 November 1889 started as an unprecedented military coup to remove the Liberal Prime Minister Viscount of Ouro Preto, who had been appointed by the Emperor and who enjoyed the confidence of the Chamber of Deputies. Marshal Deodoro da Fonseca, the senior leader and military figure in the plot, was supportive of the Conservative Party and took part in the coup upon invitation by other officers who wanted to overthrow the Liberal Prime Minister. Initially, Deodoro intended to force a Cabinet change, but not to depose Emperor Pedro II. Several of his co-conspirators, however, were republicans, and later in the day the events of the military coup progressed to the abolition of the monarchy. The decision to establish a republican provisional government was taken when Deodoro (who had already proclaimed "Long Live His Majesty the Emperor" during the public acts of the coup) received, from his republican co-conspirator Benjamin Constant Botelho de Magalhães, the false news that the Emperor intended to appoint Gaspar da Silveira Martins, a declared enemy of Deodoro, as the next Prime Minister.

After the republic was proclaimed, a presidential executive replaced the parliamentary system of government.

Presidents of the Council of Ministers of the United States of Brazil (1961–1963)

After the coup d'état that abolished the monarchy and proclaimed Brazil a republic, the system of parliamentary government was not retained. The new republic instead adopted the model of a presidential executive, except for a brief period (September 7, 1961 to January 23, 1963) during the presidency of João Goulart.

The parliamentary system was adopted in 1961 as a compromise solution to a grave political crisis, and was again abolished, this time by plebiscite, in January 1963.

The official title of the head of the government during that period was Presidente do Conselho de Ministros (President of the Council of Ministers), the same official title possessed by the 19th-century prime ministers of the Brazilian Empire. However, the holders of the office were informally addressed and referred to as Premier or Prime Minister. Often, the expression President of the Council, a simplified version of the official title, was also used.

See also

List of prime ministers of Brazil
List of Brazilian monarchs
List of governors-general of Brazil
List of presidents of Brazil
President of Brazil

References

Prime Ministers of Brazil
Political history of Brazil
Empire of Brazil politicians
1847 establishments in Brazil
1889 disestablishments in Brazil
1961 establishments in Brazil
1963 disestablishments in Brazil